Quercus gemelliflora is a tree species in the beech family Fagaceae. there are no known subspecies. It is placed in subgenus Cerris, section Cyclobalanopsis (the ring-cupped oaks).

It has been recorded from Malaysia, Indonesia and Vietnam (where it may be called sồi song sanh). The tree, grows from 15–30 m tall.

References

External links
 Plantes & botanique: Quercus gemelliflora (Fr.: accessed 12/7/2017).

gemelliflora
Flora of Indo-China
Flora of Malesia
Trees of Vietnam
Flora of Peninsular Malaysia
Trees of Borneo
Flora of Sumatra
Flora of the Borneo montane rain forests